Ofer Cassif (born 25 December 1964) is an Israeli politician. A member of the Knesset since April 2019, he represents the Hadash. Cassif is the sole Jewish member of the faction.

Biography
Cassif was born in Rishon LeZion. He attended Shalmon Elementary School and the Reali Gymnasium. Growing up in a Mapai-supporting household, he joined the Left Camp of Israel youth group at the age of 16. During his military service in the Israel Defense Forces he served in the Nahal and the Nahal paratrooper brigade. He subsequently studied philosophy at the Hebrew University of Jerusalem and earned a PhD in political philosophy at the London School of Economics with a thesis titled On nationalism and democracy: A Marxist examination, before doing a postdoctoral fellowship at Columbia University. He became a lecturer in political science at Tel Aviv University and Sapir Academic College.

Entering the political sphere, he worked as a parliamentary assistant to Hadash MK Meir Vilner. Prior to the April 2019 Knesset elections he was placed fifth on the joint Hadash–Ta'al list. In March 2019, he was banned from contesting the elections by the Central Election Committee due to provocative statements he had made, the first time an individual had been barred from a party list. However, the decision was later overturned by the Supreme Court. He subsequently entered the Knesset as the alliance won six seats. He was re-elected in elections in September 2019, 2020 and 2021.

On 9 April 2021, Cassif was assaulted by police officers while taking part in a protest against evictions in East Jerusalem. However, he was later investigated for striking the policeman first. In an interview with Haaretz, Cassif said: “I object to the ideology and practice of Zionism... it's a racist ideology and practice which espouses Jewish supremacy." Cassif identifies as a Marxist and a socialist.

Cassif is married with one son and lives in Rehovot.

References

External links

1964 births
Living people
People from Rishon LeZion
Hebrew University of Jerusalem alumni
Alumni of the London School of Economics
Columbia University faculty
Academic staff of Tel Aviv University
Academic staff of Sapir Academic College
Hadash politicians
Jewish Israeli politicians
Members of the 21st Knesset (2019)
Members of the 22nd Knesset (2019–2020)
Members of the 23rd Knesset (2020–2021)
Members of the 24th Knesset (2021–2022)
Members of the 25th Knesset (2022–)
Jewish anti-Zionism in Israel
Israeli Marxists
Jewish Israeli anti-racism activists